Fusiaphera is a genus of sea snails, marine gastropod mollusks in the family Cancellariidae, the nutmeg snails.

Species
Species within the genus Fusiaphera include:
 Fusiaphera macrospira (A. Adams & Reeve, 1850)
Synonyms 
 Fusiaphera azumai Habe, 1961: synonym of Fusiaphera macrospira (A. Adams & Reeve, 1850)
 Fusiaphera dampierensis Garrard, 1975: synonym of Fusiaphera macrospira (A. Adams & Reeve, 1850)
 Fusiaphera eva Petit, 1980: synonym of Fusiaphera macrospira (A. Adams & Reeve, 1850)
 Fusiaphera exquisita (Preston, 1905): synonym of Fusiaphera macrospira (A. Adams & Reeve, 1850)
 Fusiaphera macrospiratoides Habe, 1961: synonym of Fusiaphera macrospira (A. Adams & Reeve, 1850)
 Fusiaphera pallida (E.A. Smith, 1899a): synonym of Fusiaphera macrospira (A. Adams & Reeve, 1850)
 Fusiaphera tosaensis (Habe, 1961): synonym of Fusiaphera macrospira (A. Adams & Reeve, 1850)

References

Cancellariidae